Maasranga Television is a Bangladeshi Bengali-language satellite and cable television channel owned by the Square Group. It commenced broadcasts on 30 July 2011, and is based in Banani, Dhaka.

History 
Maasranga Television received its broadcasting license from the Bangladesh Telecommunication Regulatory Commission, along with several other privately owned Bangladeshi television channels, on 20 October 2009. The channel commenced official transmissions on 30 July 2011, with the "Rangati Elo Machranga" (রাঙাতে এল মাছরাঙা) slogan. Maasranga is the first television channel in Bangladesh to broadcast on high-definition television.

In July 2015, in observance of Eid al-Fitr, Maasranga began airing Nickelodeon India's Motu Patlu. The channel later added more Indian animated programming such as Chacha Bhatija, Gattu Battu, and ViR: The Robot Boy. On 15 August 2015, coinciding the 40th death anniversary of the founding father of Bangladesh, Sheikh Mujibur Rahman, Maasranga aired a special musical program titled Bangabandhu Ke Niye. Along with Bangladesh Television and GTV, Maasranga Television broadcast the 2016 Asia Cup for Bangladeshi audiences.

Maasranga began reairing The Adventures of Sinbad in Bangladesh on 1 January 2017, which was also formerly broadcast by Bangladesh Television. The channel also began airing the Turkish television series Diriliş: Ertuğrul on 2 April 2017. It was one of the broadcasters of the 2018 FIFA World Cup in the country. Maasranga began airing Hercules: The Legendary Journeys on 10 February 2019. The 2018 supernatural thriller film Debi had its world television premiere on Maasranga twice on 13 and 14 February 2019. In December 2019, Maasranga, along with three other Bangladeshi television channels, signed an agreement with UNICEF to air programming regarding children's issues.

Technical works and broadcasting areas
The whole production is supported by state of the art high definition (HD) television technology introduced for the first time in Bangladesh. It has a complete newsroom system, production and master control switchers and infrastructure equipment as part of the rollout of an HDTV station in Bangladesh. The whole system is fully digital and high definition (HD). Maasranga programs are broadcast round the clock covering Asia the rest of the world.

Programming

Acquired

Animated 
 Chacha Bhatija
 Gattu Battu
 Motu Patlu
 Rudra: Boom Chik Chik Boom
 Shiva
 ViR: The Robot Boy

Live-action 
 Diriliş: Ertuğrul
 Hercules: The Legendary Journeys
 The Adventures of Sinbad
 The Sword of Tipu Sultan

Drama 
 Apurba
 Home Theatre
 Housewives
 Mamlabaz
 Nogor Alo
 Poron Kotha
 Tin Goyenda

News and current affairs 
 Khelar Mathey
 Maasranga English News
 Maasranga Sangbad
 Maasranga Shamprotik
 Prime Time Maasranga News

Reality 
 Magic Bauliana
 Shera Radhuni

References

External links

Lyngsat
Maasranga TV Frequency

Television channels in Bangladesh
Television channels and stations established in 2011
2011 establishments in Bangladesh
Mass media in Dhaka
Square Group